Rogier Blink (born 13 January 1982 in Groningen) is a Dutch rower.

Blink took part in the World Championships of 2005 in Munich becoming fifth in the coxed fours. He qualified for the 2008 Summer Olympics in Beijing with the Dutch eights forming a team with Olaf van Andel, Jozef Klaassen, Meindert Klem, David Kuiper, Diederik Simon, Olivier Siegelaar, Mitchel Steenman and cox Peter Wiersum. Due to an injury Siegelaar was replaced by Reinder Lubbers during the tournament.

The Dutch eight he was part of finished in 5th place at London 2012.

References

1982 births
Living people
Dutch male rowers
Rowers at the 2008 Summer Olympics
Rowers at the 2012 Summer Olympics
Olympic rowers of the Netherlands
Sportspeople from Groningen (city)
World Rowing Championships medalists for the Netherlands
European Rowing Championships medalists
20th-century Dutch people
21st-century Dutch people